The 1946 college football season was the 78th season of intercollegiate football in the United States.  Competition included schools from the Big Ten Conference, the Pacific Coast Conference (PCC), the Southeastern Conference (SEC), the Big Six Conference, the Southern Conference, the Southwestern Conference, and numerous smaller conferences and independent programs. The season saw the return of many programs which had suspended play during World War II, and also the enrollment of many veterans returning from the war. 

The teams ranked highest in the final Associated Press poll in December 1946 were:
 The 1946 Notre Dame Fighting Irish football team compiled an 8–0–1  record and was ranked No. 1 in the final AP poll. The Fighting Irish, led by consensus All-Americans Johnny Lujack at quarterback and George Connor at tackle, played a scoreless tie against No. 2 Army in a game billed as the "Game of the Century". Notre Dame also ranked first in the nation in total offense (441.3 yards per game), rushing offense (340.1 yards per game), and total defense (141.7 yards per game).
 The 1946 Army Cadets football team compiled a 9–0–1 and was ranked No. 2 in the final AP poll. Army had won consecutive national championships in 1944 and 1945 and was led by 1946 Heisman Trophy winner Glenn Davis and 1945 Heisman winner Doc Blanchard.
 The 1946 Georgia Bulldogs football team compiled a perfect 11–0 record, won the Southeastern Conference (SEC) championship, was ranked No. 3 in the final AP poll, and defeated No. 9 North Carolina in the Sugar Bowl. The Bulldogs ranked second nationally in total offense (394.6 yards per game).  They were led by Charley Trippi who tallied 1,366 yards of total offense and won the Maxwell Award as the best player in college football.
 The 1946 UCLA Bruins football team compiled a 10–0 record in the regular season, won the Pacific Coast Conference (PCC) championship, was ranked No. 4 in the final AP poll, but lost to No. 5 Illinois in the Rose Bowl.

The year's statistical leaders included Rudy Mobley of Hardin–Simmons with 1,262 rushing yards, Travis Tidwell of Auburn with 1,715 yards of total offense, Bobby Layne of Texas with 1,122 passing yards, and Joe Carter of Florida N&I with 152 points scored.

Delaware compiled a 10–0 record and was recognized by the AP as the small college national champion. Morgan State (8–0) and Tennessee A&I (10–1) have been recognized as the black college national champions.

Conference and program changes

Conference establishments
Three conferences began football play in 1946:
College Conference of Illinois – an active NCAA Division III conference; now known as the College Conference of Illinois and Wisconsin
Dakota-Iowa Athletic Conference –  a conference active through the 1948 season
Mason-Dixon Conference – an NCAA Division III conference active through the 1974 season

Membership changes

Season timeline

September
Significant games played in September 1946 included the following:

September 21
 Indiana was upset by Cincinnati, 15–6, at home in Bloomington. Indiana had won the Big Ten championship in 1945 with a No. 4 ranking in the final AP Poll.
 Houston played its first ever football game, losing by a 13–7 score against Southwestern Louisiana.

September 27-28 
 Oklahoma A&M, AFCA national champion in 1945, was tied 21–21 by Arkansas
 Army defeated Oklahoma, 21–7, at West Point. 
 Notre Dame won at Illinois, 26–6. Illinois went on to win the Big Nine championship.
 Georgia defeated Clemson, 35–12, in their annual rivalry game.
 Indiana lost again, 21–0 at Michigan. 
 Tennessee defeated Georgia Tech, 13–9, in their annual rivalry game.
 UCLA beat Oregon State, 50–7. UCLA and Oregon State finished the season in first and second place in the Pacific Coast Conference.

October

October 5
 Army beat Cornell 46–21.  
 Navy lost at Columbia and dropped the rest of its games, finishing 1–8–0.  
 Oklahoma A&M lost 54–6 at Texas and would finish at 3–7–1.  
 Notre Dame beat Pittsburgh 33–0.  
 Michigan beat Iowa 14–7.  
 UCLA won at Washington, 39–13. 
 
The first AP Poll of the 1946 season was issued on October 7 with Texas ranked No. 1, Army No. 2, Notre Dame No. 3, Michigan No. 4 and UCLA No. 5.

October 12  
 In Dallas, No. 1 Texas beat Oklahoma 20–13.  
 No. 2 Army and No. 4 Michigan met in Ann Arbor, Michigan, and the visiting Cadets won 20–13.  
 No. 3 Notre Dame beat Purdue 49–6.  
 No. 5 UCLA beat No. 17 Stanford 26–6. 

The next poll featured No. 1 Army, No. 2 Notre Dame, No. 3 Texas, No. 4 UCLA, and No. 5 Michigan.

October 19  
 No. 1 Army beat No. 11 Columbia 48–14.  
 No. 2 Notre Dame was idle.  
 No. 3 Texas beat No. 14 Arkansas 20–0.  
 No. 4 UCLA won at California 13–6.
 No. 5 Michigan and No. 10 Northwestern played to a 14–14 tie.  
 No. 9 Tennessee beat No. 7 Alabama 12–0. 

Army, Notre Dame, and Texas stayed as the top three, ahead of No. 4 Tennessee and No. 5 UCLA.

October 26 
 At the Polo Grounds in New York, No. 1 Army beat No. 13 Duke 19–0.  * No. 2 Notre Dame won at No. 17 Iowa, 49–6.  
 In Houston, No. 3 Texas lost to No. 16 Rice, 18–13.  
 No. 4 Tennessee lost to unranked Wake Forest, 19–6. 
 No. 5 UCLA beat Santa Clara 33–7.  
 No. 6 Penn beat Navy 32–19
 No. 7 Georgia won at Furman, 70–7. 

The next poll was No. 1 Army, No. 2 Notre Dame, No. 3 Penn, No. 4 UCLA, and No. 5 Georgia.

November

November 2
 No. 1 Army beat West Virginia, 19–0.
 In Baltimore, No. 2 Notre Dame defeated Navy, 28–0.
 No. 3 Penn lost to Princeton, 17–14.
 No. 5 Georgia beat No. 15 Alabama, 14–0.
 No. 4 UCLA beat St. Mary's, 46–20, in a Friday night game.  
 No. 8 Rice beat Texas Tech 41–6

In the poll that followed  No. 1 Army, No. 2 Notre Dame, No. 3 Georgia, and No. 4 UCLA, and No. 5 Rice.

November 9  
 A crowd of 74,000 turned out at New York's Yankee Stadium to watch No. 1 Army and No. 2 Notre Dame in a meeting of the nation's two unbeaten and untied teams. Both teams missed scoring opportunities.  In the opening quarter, Army recovered a fumble on the Irish 24, but was stopped on fourth down at the 13 yard line.  The Irish drove to the Army three yard line in the second quarter but no further.  Army reached the Irish 20 yard line in the third quarter, but Notre Dame's Terry Brennan picked off a pass from Glenn Davis.  In the last quarter, a bad punt was returned by Davis to the Irish 39 yard line, but Notre Dame forced a fumble and stopped any further scoring chances.  The game ended in a scoreless tie, 0–0.
.  
 In Jacksonville, No. 3 Georgia beat Florida 33-14.
 In Portland, No. 4 UCLA beat Oregon 14–0.  
 No. 5 Rice lost in Little Rock to Arkansas, 7–0.  

In the poll that followed, No. 9 Penn moved back up to No. 5 after beating Columbia in New York's "other" football game, 41–6. The top four remained the same.

November 16
 In its third meeting against a Top Five team, No. 1 Army beat No. 5 Penn in Philadelphia, 34–7.  
 No. 2 Notre Dame beat Northwestern, 27–0. 
 No. 3 Georgia beat Auburn 41–0 in a neutral site in Columbus, Georgia.
 No. 4 UCLA beat Montana 61–7.  
 No. 9 Illinois beat No. 13 Ohio State 16–7 and replaced Penn at No. 5.

November 23
 No. 1 Army was idle.
 No. 2 Notre Dame beat Tulane in New Orleans, 41–0.
 No. 3 Georgia won at Chattanooga, 48–27.
 No. 4 UCLA defeated No. 10 USC 13–6.
 No. 5 Illinois won at Northwestern, 20–0, to close its season with an 8–1–0 record. 
 No. 8 Michigan defeated Ohio State, 58–6, in Columbus.

The top five remained the same.

November 30  
 No. 1 Army barely beat a 1–7–0 Navy team, 21–18
 No. 2 Notre Dame beat No. 16 USC 26–6. Army still had a 9-0-1 record and had been ranked No. 1 in 22 of the last 23 AP Polls dating back to 1944, but the results of the final games convinced the voters to move the Irish up to first place in the postseason poll and the Cadets down to second.
 No. 3 Georgia defeated No. 7 Georgia Tech 35–7
 No. 4 UCLA beat Nebraska, 18–0, and accepted an invitation to face No. 5 Illinois in the Rose Bowl.

With the exception of Notre Dame leapfrogging Army, the rankings of the other top-five teams remained the same.

December
On December 2, the final AP Poll was issued with Notre Dame at No. 1, Army at No. 2, Georgia at No. 3, UCLA at No. 4, Illinois at No. 5, Michigan at No. 6, Tennessee at No. 7, LSU at No. 8, North Carolina at No. 9, and Rice at No. 10.

Notable post-season games played in December included:
 December 7: Tennessee A&I defeated West Virginia State, 27–7, in the Derby Bowl
 December 7: Lincoln (PA) defeated Florida A&M, 20-14, in the Orange Blossom Classic
 December 7: Southern defeated Xavier of Louisiana, 35-0, in New Orleans
 December 7: Allen defeated Fayetteville State, 40-6, in the Piedmont Tobacco Bowl.
 December 14: Muhlenberg defeated St. Bonaventure, 26–25, in the Tobacco Bowl
 December 21: USC defeated Tulane, 20–13, in New Orleans
 December 23: Stanford defeated Hawaii, 18–7, in Honolulu.
 December 25: Southern defeated Tuskegee, 64-7, in the Yam Bowl
 December 28: Florida A&M and Wiley played to a 6-6 tie in the Angel Bowl.

New Year's Day bowl games

Major bowls
Wednesday, January 1, 1947

No. 1 Notre Dame (8–0–1), No. 2 Army (9–0–1), and No. 6 Michigan (6–2–1) were idle in bowl season.

Other bowls
Wednesday, January 1, 1947

^ 

 January 1: Tennessee A&I defeated Louisville Municipal, 32–0, in the Vulcan Bowl
 January 1: Lincoln (MO) defeated Prairie View A&M, 14–0, in the Prairie View Bowl.
 January 1: Arkansas AM&N defeated Lane, 7-0, in the Cattle Bowl.
 January 1: Pepperdine defeated Nebraska Wesleyan, 38-13, in the Will Rogers Bowl.

Conference standings

Major conference standings

Major independents

Minor conferences

Minor conference standings

Non-major independents

Rankings

Award and honors

Heisman Trophy voting
The Heisman Trophy is given to the year's most outstanding player

All-America Team

Statistical leaders

Team leaders

Total offense

Total defense

Rushing offense

Rushing defense

Passing offense

Passing defense

Individual leaders

Total offense

Rushing

Passing

Receiving

Scoring
The following list of scoring leaders is taken from the NCAA's Official Football Guide for 1947 and includes both major and minor college players. Gene "Choo-Choo" Roberts ranked third overall and first among major college players.

Rules Committee
 Earl Krieger, secretary
 W. J. Bingham (Harvard), chairman
 Amos Alonzo Stagg (Pacific), life member
 William Alexander (Georgia Tech), member-at-large
 Tuss McLaughry (Dartmouth), 1st District
 Biff Jones (Army), 2nd District
 Wallace Wade (Duke), 3rd District
 Fritz Crisler (Michigan), 4th District
 Ernest C. Quigley (Kansas), 5th District
 Dana X. Bible (Texas), 6th District
 Harry W. Hughes (Colorado A&M), 7th District
 Willis O. Hunter (USC), 8th District

References